Al Harrington (born 1980) is an American former basketball player and coach.

Al or Albert Harrington may also refer to:
Al Harrington (actor) (1935–2021), American television actor
Al Harrington (Family Guy), fictional character from the American animated TV series Family Guy
Albert Harrington (merchant) (1850–1914), Minnesota grain merchant

See also
Alan Harrington (1933–2019), Welsh footballer